Russell Meyer (born 1972) is a former New Zealand international lawn bowler.

Bowls career
In 2000 he won a pairs bronze medal with Paul Girdler at the 2000 World Outdoor Bowls Championship in Johannesburg and four years later won another bronze medal in the singles at the 2004 World Outdoor Bowls Championship in Ayr. In 2002, he won the Hong Kong International Bowls Classic pairs title with Paul Girdler.

In 2008 he won double gold winning both the pairs and fours at the 2008 World Outdoor Bowls Championship in Christchurch.

He won five medals at the Asia Pacific Bowls Championships, four of which were gold medals.

He won the 2008 singles title and 1998 pairs title at the New Zealand National Bowls Championships when bowling for the Cabramatta & Northern Bowls Clubs respectively.

References

External links
 

Living people
New Zealand male bowls players
1972 births
Bowls World Champions
Bowls players at the 2006 Commonwealth Games
Commonwealth Games competitors for New Zealand
20th-century New Zealand people
21st-century New Zealand people